New Blood is a 1999 Canadian-British action thriller film written and directed by Michael Hurst and starring John Hurt, Nick Moran, Carrie-Anne Moss, Shawn Wayans and Joe Pantoliano.

Cast
John Hurt as Alan White
Nick Moran as Danny White
Carrie-Anne Moss as Leigh
Shawn Wayans as Valentine
Joe Pantoliano as Hellman
Gouchy Boy as Lawrence
Eugene Robert Glazer as Mr. Ryan
Richard Fitzpatrick as Lt. Caldercourt
Alan Peterson as Frayerling
Rob Freeman as Robert Williams
Arthur Eng as Yin Yang
Alex Karzis as Webster

Reception
David Stratton of Variety gave the film a positive review and wrote, "It’s a convoluted setup for what’s basically a standard thriller, but thanks to persuasive performances from Hurt and, especially, Moran, it just about works."

References

External links
 
 

1990s English-language films
Films directed by Michael Hurst